Josef Niklas (11 March 1817 – 10 October 1877) was a Czech architect. In 1873–1874 he was a rector of the Czech Technical University in Prague.

External links

List of Rectors of the Czech Technical University in Prague

Czech architects
1817 births
1877 deaths
Czech Technical University in Prague
19th-century Czech architects
People from Volyně